Francisco Dias Gomes (1745 – 30 September 1795) was a Portuguese poet and literary critic.

Biography
Francisco Dias Gomes was born in Lisbon, the son of Fructuoso Dias, a local tradesman, and his wife Vivência Gomes. His work was little known to contemporary men of letters and his career was spent primarily writing poetry in elegiac meter and studying the progress of Portugal's language and literature.

He died of an epidemic fever in 1795.

References

Works
 Analise e Combinações Filosóficas sobre a Elocução e Estilo de Sá de Miranda, Ferreira, Bernardes, Caminha, e Camões (1792).  
 Ifigenia: Tragédia Tirada da História Grega (1798).
 Obras Poeticas de Francisco Dias Gomes (1799).
 Electra (1799).
 Elegia à Morte de hum Homem Honrado e Virtuoso (1799).

Further reading
 Prado Coelho, Jacinto do (1971). "Francisco Dias Gomes, Crítico Literário," Revista da Faculdade de Letras de Lisboa, II Série, No. 13.

External links
 

1745 births
1795 deaths
People from Lisbon
18th-century Portuguese poets
Portuguese male poets
Portuguese Roman Catholics
Roman Catholic writers
18th-century male writers